Martuk is a district of Aktobe Region in Kazakhstan. The administrative center of the district is the selo of Martuk. Population:

References

Districts of Kazakhstan
Aktobe Region